Vice Admiral Arthur Charles Burgoyne Bromley (16 September 1847 – 25 October 1909) was a Royal Navy officer who became Admiral Superintendent of Malta Dockyard.

Naval career
Promoted to captain on 30 June 1888, Bromley became commanding officer of the battleship HMS Hood in September 1897 and Inspecting Captain of Boys' Training Ships in January 1899. Promoted to rear admiral on 2 November 1901, he became Admiral Superintendent of Malta Dockyard in January 1905. He was promoted to vice admiral on 8 March 1906.

References

1847 births
1909 deaths
Royal Navy vice admirals
Place of birth missing